Heavenly Music is a 1943 American musical short fantasy film directed by Josef Berne. It won an Oscar at the 16th Academy Awards in 1944 for Best Short Subject (Two-Reel).

Plot
Ted Barry, a jazz band leader and songwriter, has just died and is entering heaven. He is not recognized by St. Peter and has no references. He sings one of his hit songs and an angel, Joy, recognizes him from her time on earth. Barry wants to be admitted into the Hall of Music, made up of famous classical composers such as Beethoven, Tchaikovsky, Brahms, Wagner, Bach, and others. The composers have never heard of the boogie woogie or dixieland styles of music that Barry is known for, so he must audition for them. His audition melody has been borrowed from the Nutcracker Suite, and Tchaikovsky recognizes it and becomes angered. Barry points out that the same theme was also stolen from Wagner and Brahms, proving that he has a good knowledge of the classics.

Beethoven says that Barry must also prove that he has musical ability, giving him ten minutes to compose an original song. In frustration, Barry is going to quit, but Joy helps him write a song by becoming his muse. He writes and performs the song for the committee, but is denied and told he should return in 200 years to see if his music can stand the test of time. Joy speaks on his behalf, saying that his melody is beautiful, and could be played in any style. She asks several composers to play the melody in the individual classical and romantic styles of Chopin, Liszt, Rimsky-Korsakov, Strauss, and Beethoven. The committee decides to accept Barry into the Hall of Music and they all play his song together in a jazz style, and Gabriel enters playing jazz trumpet.

Cast
 Fred Brady as Ted Barry
 Mary Elliott as Joy, an angel
 Eric Blore as Mr. Frisbie
 Steven Geray as Ludwig van Beethoven
 Fritz Feld as Niccolò Paganini (uncredited)
 Elmer Jerome as Official Recorder (uncredited)
 Lionel Royce as Pyotr Tchaikovsky (uncredited)
 Billie "Buckwheat" Thomas as Gabriel (uncredited)

References

External links
 
 
 

1943 films
1943 short films
1940s fantasy films
1940s English-language films
Live Action Short Film Academy Award winners
American black-and-white films
Metro-Goldwyn-Mayer short films
American fantasy films
Films directed by Josef Berne
1940s American films